The 2022 TotalEnergies 6 Hours of Spa-Francorchamps was an endurance sports car racing event held at the Circuit de Spa-Francorchamps, Stavelot, Belgium on 7 May 2022. It was the second round of the 2022 FIA World Endurance Championship, and was the eleventh running of the event as part of the championship.

Background 
The provisional calendar for the 2022 FIA World Endurance Championship released in August 2021. It saw a few changes, with the return of the Sebring and Fuji races, whilst the Portimao and second Bahrain races were dropped.

Entry list 
The entry list was revealed on 25 March 2022.

Qualifying 
Pole position winners in each class are marked in bold.

Race 
The race was stopped thrice during the course of the event with red flags. The first stoppage was after the crash of the #44 ARC Bratislava entry, which required repairs to the barriers. The second stoppage was for a long period of heavy rain showering the circuit and the last stoppage was after the crash of the #34 Inter Europol Competition entry.

Race Result 
The minimum number of laps for classification (70% of overall winning car's distance) was 73 laps.

Standings after the race 

2022 Hypercar World Endurance Drivers' Championship

2022 Hypercar World Endurance Manufacturers' World Championship

2022 World Endurance GTE Drivers' Championship

2022 World Endurance GTE Manufacturers' Championship

 Note: Only the top five positions are included for the Drivers' Championship standings.

References

6 Hours of Spa-Francorchamps
Auto races in Belgium
Circuit de Spa-Francorchamps
Spa-Francorchamps
6 Hours of Spa-Francorchamps
6 Hours of Spa-Francorchamps